Humayun Saifullah Khan is a Pakistani politician and a former Member of the National Assembly of Pakistan from 2008 to 2013. He belongs to the Saifullah Khan family from  Khyber Pakhtunkhwa province.

Political career
He has served as district Nazim of Lakki Marwat in the past.

He was elected to the National Assembly of Pakistan from NA-27 (Lakki Marwat) as a candidate of Pakistan Muslim League (Q) in 2008 Pakistani general election.

References 

Living people
Humayun
People named in the Panama Papers
Pakistani MNAs 2008–2013
Year of birth missing (living people)